Stefan Kozlov was the defending champion but chose not to defend his title.

Ante Pavić won the title after defeating Alexander Ward 6–7(11–13), 6–4, 6–3 in the final.

Seeds

Draw

Finals

Top half

Bottom half

References
Main Draw
Qualifying Draw

Columbus Challenger - Singles
Columbus Challenger